The men's high jump at the 1950 European Athletics Championships was held in Brussels, Belgium, at Heysel Stadium on 25 and 27 August 1950.

Medalists

Results

Final
27 August

Qualification
25 August

Participation
According to an unofficial count, 11 athletes from 7 countries participated in the event.

 (2)
 (2)
 (1)
 (2)
 (1)
 (2)
 (1)

References

High jump
High jump at the European Athletics Championships